Peterston-super-Ely is the name of an electoral ward in the Vale of Glamorgan, Wales, which covers its namesake village of Peterston-super-Ely and the neighbouring communities of Pendoylan and Welsh St Donats. The ward elects a county councillor to the Vale of Glamorgan Council.

According to the 2011 census the population of the ward was 2,289.

In 2022 St Georges super Ely was transferred from Peterston-super-Ely to a new ward, as a result of recommendations from the Local Democracy and Boundary Commission for Wales.

County councillors
The ward elects one councillor to the Vale of Glamorgan Council.

A. J. (Tony) Williams represented Peterson-super-Ely for the Conservative Party until 2007. He had been a local government councillor since before the 1974 local government reorganisation. He and his wife were found dead at their Cowbridge home in June 2017. The ward was then represented by Rhodri Traherne for the Conservatives. 

In 2017 Michael Morgan was elected for the Conservatives. However, in May 2019 he moved to the Vale Independents Group along with several other Conservative councillors. In the 2022 election Morgan held the ward as an independent, although his share of the vote dropped by 19.0% on 2017.

Cardiff Rural District Council
Prior to 1974, Peterson-super-Ely was a ward to Cardiff Rural District Council, electing one councillor. In 1970 it elected an Independent councillor, W. J. Meredith.

References

Vale of Glamorgan electoral wards